Tachi (written:  or ) is a Japanese surname. Notable people with the surname include:

, Japanese actor and singer
, Japanese footballer
, Japanese racing driver
, Japanese lawyer
, Japanese racing driver
, Japanese academic

Japanese-language surnames